Middleton is a hamlet and civil parish in the Harrogate district of North Yorkshire, England. It is on the border with West Yorkshire and 1 mile north of the town centre of Ilkley, West Yorkshire and is continuous with the Middleton suburb of the town (the area lying north of the River Wharfe). Westville House School is the closest school, on the outskirts of Ilkley.

References

External links

Villages in North Yorkshire
Civil parishes in North Yorkshire
Borough of Harrogate